Soroti Secondary School is a government secondary school located in Soroti Town in Uganda. Its EMIS code in the Ministry of Education and Sports (Uganda) is 10706. Its enrolment is about 4000 students.

References

Secondary schools in Uganda
Soroti District